Paupack may refer to:

Paupack, Pennsylvania, an unincorporated community in Pike County
Paupack Township, Wayne County, Pennsylvania